Gabriel Lester (Amsterdam 1972) is an inventor, visual artist and film director living and working in Amsterdam.

Family 

Lester was born in Amsterdam on 6 February 1972, son of Mark Dunning Lester (New York City, USA 1947) and Frederika Rolande Wilhelmina Erwteman (Brussels, Belgium 1944, † Groningen, Netherlands 2006). Lester grew up in a cooperative commune named ‘Impuls’ in the small village of Pieterburen, in the province of Groningen (the Netherlands).

Music 

In the nineteen eighties Lester became invested in early street and hip-hop culture. He began graffiti writing under the ‘tag name’ Catch. Lester later produced and published rap and electronic music as Utile Connection and Definitely Def using so called tape loops, cassette decks and turntables before moving into digital samplers and sequencers.

Education and Residencies 

In 1994, Lester attended a course of audiovisual arts at the Sint Joost art academy. In 1995 Lester entered a course in experimental cinema at the Sint-Lukas Hogeschool in Brussels (Belgium). In 1999, Gabriel Lester started a two-year residency at the Rijksakademie.

Between 2003 and 2014 Lester was a resident at IASPIS, Stockholm, Sweden, ISCP, New York, USA, ROAD, Capacete, mobile residency, Brazil & Peru, TWS Tokyo Wonder Site, Tokyo, Japan, Elam School of Art, Artist in Residence, Auckland, New Zealand.

Artistic practice 

Visual artist, electronic musician, poet, and experiential filmmaker, Lester’s works consist of spatial installations, video installations, sculptures, performances, and short films. Other activities include commissioned art in public space, small scale architecture, mentoring and teaching. Lester’s practise has always been international, with many art residencies, group and solo exhibitions, gallery representations in Europe, North America, and Asia. Lester has participated in over twenty large scale international art exhibitions, such as the Documenta in Kassel and the biennale of Venice, Sao Paulo, Istanbul and Sydney.  

Lester’s creations originate from a desire to tell stories and establish contexts and settings that support these stories or propose their own narrative interpretation. His vocabulary is characterized as cinematographic, without necessarily employing film or video as a medium. However, like moviemaking, Lester’s practice has come to embrace and utilize all imaginable media and talent. With emphasis on human existence and experience, his projects aim to sharpen and flex the mind. Open ended, sustaining mystery and without obvious dogma or singular ideas, Lester proposes ways to relate to the world, how it is represented and what mechanisms and components constitute our perception and understanding of it. Lester currently resides in Amsterdam and is represented by the Vanguard gallery in Shanghai, Ryan Lee gallery in New York and the Fons Welters in Amsterdam.

Lester frequently collaborates with Raimundas Malašauskas, Aaron Schuster, Onco Tattje, Carlos Amorales, Job Chajes and Arnaud Hendrickx. Other collaborators include: Jennifer Tee, Freek Wambacq, Thomas Bakker, Herwig Weiser.

Lester’s work is part of several public and private collections, including the Stedelijk Museum, Amsterdam, 798 Art Zone Beijing, 21 Museum Nashville, Mudam Luxembourg, CitizenM, and Museum Boijmans Van Beuningen, Rotterdam.

Publications on the work of Gabriel Lester include: How to Act (monograph, Veenman publishers 2006), ‘Gabriel Lester’s Elevating the Witte de With’ (Paperkunsthalle 2007), ‘62 Gasoline Stations’ (artist book self-published 2007), Forced Perspectives (monograph, Sternberg Press 2015), Cinema Without Camera (2019)

PolyLester 
PolyLester - established by Gabriel Lester and Martine Vledder in 2013 - is a multidisciplinary design studio focusing on artworks, public sculptures, architectural interventions, landscapes, and interior design. PolyLester works together with an array of architects, designers, including such prominent creatives as Irma Boom, Beau Architects, Monadnock, Rem Koolhaas, URA Architects, Richard Niessen, Hella Jongerius and Jennifer Tee.

Curriculum

Selected solo exhibitions

2020 Holes in the Sky - Machinery of Me, Arnhem Netherlands
2017 Aeon and Lester’s Loops Groninger museum, Groningen (NL)
If you happen to be Ryan Lee gallery, New York (USA)
2016 Apple Z De Appel Art center, Amsterdam (NL)
The 9 Day Week CAC museum, Vilnius (LT)
2014 The Ears Have Walls Leo Xu Projects, Shanghai (CH)
Follies Bonner Kunstverein, Bonn (D)
Blank Stare Gus Fisher Gallery, Auckland (NZ)
2012 Roxy Minsheng Museum, Shanghai (CH)
The Future that Was NASA/Smart, Amsterdam (NL)
2011 Suspension of Disbelief Museum Boijmans Van Beuningen, Rotterdam (NL)
2009 ProMotion Z33, Hasselt (B)

Selected group exhibitions

Busan Biennale, South Korea
Heaven, Hell & Earth Stedelijk museum Den Bosch
Kochi Biennale, India
Moscow biennale Moscow (RUS)
Istanbul biennale Istanbul (TUR)
Sydney biennale Sydney (AUS)
Marrakesh Biennale Marrakesh (MOR)
CAFA museum Beijing (CH)
2013 Garden of Diversion Sifang museum, Nanjing (CH)
Performa 13 New York (USA)
Venice Biennale Venice (IT)
Sharjah Bienniale Sharjah (UAE)
2012 dOCUMENTA (13) Kassel (D)
Sao Paulo Biennial (BR)
Secret Ninth Planet MA CCA, San Francisco (USA)
Slow Movement Kunsthalle Bern (CH)

Boards / Positions 

2016 - 2019 Main tutor Fine Arts Sandberg, Rietveld, Amsterdam
2013 – 2020 Teacher Audio Visual Department Rietveld, Amsterdam
2014 – 2015 Artist in Residence Academie van Bouwkunst, AHK, Amsterdam
2016 – now Board Melly center for contemporary art, Rotterdam
2014 – now Board The One Minutes Foundation, Amsterdam

Gallery

References

External links 
 
 PolyLester
 LestarFilm
 Artist Page At Fons Welters Gallery
 Ryan Lee Gallery
 Lester's News at Leo Xu Projects
 https://web.archive.org/web/20121024205429/http://www.frieze.com/issue/article/gabriel_lester/
 http://www.tokyoartbeat.com/tablog/entries.en/2006/10/interview_with_gabriel_lester.html
 http://www.trouwamsterdam.nl/2010/12/8-dec-beamclub-16-gabriel-lester/ 
 https://web.archive.org/web/20101206175349/http://boijmans.nl/en/7/calendar-exhibitions/calendaritem/625/gabriel-lester
 Gabriel Lester at Artist Pension Trust

1972 births
Living people
Dutch contemporary artists
Artists from Amsterdam
People from De Marne